The Mitsubishi KE engine is a range of engines produced by Mitsubishi Motors during the 1960s and early 1970s. They were extensively used in the various Colt-branded vehicles the company produced from 1963.

The engines were overhead valve iron-blocks, for gasoline and diesel use. The first digit after the KE denotes the number of cylinders, straight-4s becoming KE4 and six-cylinder versions such as the single overhead camshaft 2.0 L straight-6 which was developed in 1964 for the new Mitsubishi Debonair flagship sedan, receiving the KE6 prefix. The last digit is simply a serial, denoting which number engine it is. Some of these engines, such as the two-liter KE42, were further developed into overhead-cam engines and were named Astron.

As a large scale manufacturer, Mitsubishi had a wealth of experience building engines, both gasoline and diesel, in V and straight engine block configurations during the war. One of their many examples was the air-cooled A6120VDe air-cooled inline 6-cylinder 14.4 L diesel and the SA12200VD air-cooled V-12 diesel (21.7 litres).

Specifications

KE41
The KE41 is a diesel engine sharing the dimensions of the KE42 petrol unit.

KE42
The petrol-powered KE42 was first used in the Mitsubishi Jupiter Junior truck beginning in 1963. In 1973, the KE42 was upgraded to meet new emissions regulations and received the MCA (Mitsubishi Clean Air) name to reflect this. This engine was developed into an overhead-cam unit, called the Astron 4G52.

KE43

KE44

KE45

KE46

KE47
The KE47 was largely replaced by the 2.4 liter Astron 4G53 in 1975.

KE63

KE64

KE65

References

KE
Straight-four engines
Straight-six engines
Diesel engines by model
Gasoline engines by model